National Centre Union (UCN) was a political party in Guatemala founded in 1983, by Jorge Carpio Nicolle, Ramiro de León Carpio and Mario Taracena.

References

External links

Centrist parties in North America
Political parties established in 1983
Political parties disestablished in 2000
Political parties in Guatemala